Norman is both a surname and a given name. The surname has multiple origins including English, Irish (in Ulster), Scottish, German, French,  Norwegian, Ashkenazi Jewish, and Jewish American. The given name Norman is mostly of English origin, though in some cases it can be an Anglicised form of a Scottish Gaelic personal name.

Etymology

Surname 
There are several different origins of the surname Norman.

As a surname of English, Irish (in Ulster), Scottish and Dutch origin the name was used to denote someone of Scandinavian ancestry or someone from Normandy (northern France). During the Middle Ages Scandinavian Vikings called themselves norðmenn ("men from the North"), which remains the Norwegian term for "Norwegian." By 1066 Scandinavian settlers in England had been absorbed and Northman and Norman were used as bynames and later as personal names by both English and English of Scandinavian descent. After the Norman Invasion of England in 1066, the name Norman took on a new meaning as England was invaded by Normans from Normandy (in northern France). The Normans were themselves descendants of Scandinavians who had established a state in Normandy; thus the term has the same meaning whether it refers to descendants of first wave Scandinavian settlers of the British isles or Normans from Normandy.
As a surname of French origin the name is a regional name denoting someone from Normandy.
As a surname of Dutch origin the surname is an ethnic name for someone of Norwegian descent.
As a surname of Jewish (Ashkenazic) origin the surname is a variant of Nordman.
As a surname of Jewish (American) origin the surname is an Americanization of a similar-sounding Ashkenazic name. In at least one case Norman is used as an Americanization of Novominsky, which is a name of a family originating in Uman, Ukraine. This family on coming to the United States of America changed their name to Norman, and relatives in Russia likewise changed their names from Novominsky to Norman.
As a surname of Swedish origin the name is derived the two elements: norr (north) + man ("man").

Given name 
Norman as a given name is of mostly English origin. It is a Germanic name and is composed of the elements nord ("north") + man ("man"). The name can be found in England before the Norman Invasion of 1066, but gained popularity by its use by Norman settlers in England after the invasion. In Norway, the demonym of its people in Norwegian are Nordmann (pronounce Normann), and has the exactly same meaning as the name origin of the Normans. In the Scottish Highlands, Norman is sometimes used as an Anglicised form of the Norwegian and Scottish Gaelic Tormod (derived from the Norse Þórmóðr). A pet form of the Scottish given name is Norrie. There are several Scottish feminine forms of the given name Norman. These include: Normanna, Normina, Norma, Nora, and Mona.

In England, the use of Norman as a given name is dying out. For example, in 2005 only two newborn boys were given the name; one in Shropshire and another in Tyne and Wear.

Distribution

England, Wales and the Isle of Man 
Norman is ranked as the 273rd most common surname in the 1999–2001 National Health Service Central Register of England, Wales and the Isle of Man (the register utilises birth and death registers from 1999 to 2001).

Ireland 
The surname Norman is of English origin, having arrived in the province of Ulster in the 17th century during the plantation era (See Plantation of Ulster and Plantations of Ireland). The surname is most common in Dublin, Belfast and Cork. Below is a table of Norman households recorded in the Primary Valuation (Griffith's valuation) property survey of 1848–64.

United States 
Surname: In the 1990 Census Norman is ranked as the 396th most frequent surname. By the 2000 Census the surname was ranked at 461st most frequent surname. The table below shows the statistics for the surname Norman in the 2000 Census See footnote for description of the header.
{| class="wikitable"
|-
! name
! rank
! count
! prop100k
! cum_prop100k
! pctwhite
! pctblack
! pctapi
! pctaian
! pct2prace
! pcthispanic
|-
| NORMAN
| 461
| 65269
| 24.2
| 31690.75
| 71.58
| 24.13
| 0.42
| 0.61
| 1.71
| 1.54
|}

Given name: Norman is ranked as the 113th most frequent male given name in the 1990 Census.

People

Surname 
Abby Norman (beauty pageant titleholder), Miss Wyoming USA
Abby Norman (writer), American science writer
Al Norman, the founder of Sprawl-Busters, a noted anti-sprawl activism organization
Albert Norman MBE (1882–1964), one of the founders of the Institute of Biomedical Science
Alexandra Norman, (born 1983), professional squash player who represents Canada
Alfred Merle Norman (1831–1918), British clergyman, naturalist and marine zoologist
Andrew Norman (born 1980), English professional snooker player
Andrew Norman (born 1979), American composer of contemporary classical music
Andrew Norman (rugby league) (born 1972), Papua New Guinean rugby league player
Aneurin Norman (born 1991), Welsh cricketer
Anna-Kajsa Norman (1820–1903), known as Spel-Stina, Swedish folk musician, spelman and a composer
Anthony W. Norman (1938–2019), professor emeritus of biochemistry and biomedical sciences at the University of California, Riverside
Archie Norman (born 1954), British businessman and politician
 Sir Arthur Norman (1917–2011), British industrialist
 Arthur Charles Alfred Norman (1858–1944), British architect 
 Arthur Norman (computer scientist), British computer scientist
 Arthur St. Norman (1878–1956), South African long-distance runner
Barak Norman (c. 1670 – c. 1740), English string instrument maker
Barry Norman (1933–2017), British film critic
Bebo Norman (born 1973), contemporary Christian musician
Birger Norman (1914–1995), Swedish journalist, poet, novelist, playwright and non-fiction writer
Bob Norman (born 1969), South Florida journalist
Charles Norman CBE (1891–1974), General Officer Commanding Aldershot District
Charles Norman (cricketer) (1833–1889), English banker and cricketer
Charlie Norman (1920–2005), Swedish musician and entertainer
Chris Norman (born 1950), British musician
Chris Norman (American football) (born 1962), former punter in National Football League
Chris Norman (flautist) (born in Halifax, Nova Scotia) (born 1963), flautist
Connie Norman (1949–1996), American AIDS and trans rights activist
Conolly Norman (1853–1908), Irish alienist or psychiatrist
Corey Norman (born 1991), Australian aboriginal rugby league player
Craig Norman, native of Greenfield Park, Quebec
Dan Norman (born 1952), former right fielder in Major League Baseball
Daniel Norman (born 1964), Canadian slalom canoer
David Norman (disambiguation)
Decima Norman, MBE (1909–1983), Australian athlete
Denis Norman (1931–2019), English-born Zimbabwean former politician
Dennis Norman (born 1980), American football guard
Desmond Norman (1929–2002), British aircraft designer
Diana Norman (1933–2011), British author and journalist
Dianne Norman (born 1971), Canadian former basketball player
Dinah Margaret Norman (born 1946), British chess master
Dick Norman (born 1971), Belgian tennis player
Dick Norman (American football) (born 1938), former American football quarterback
Donald Norman (born 1935), professor and usability consultant
Dorothy Norman (1905–1997), American photographer, writer, editor, arts patron, advocate for social change
E. Herbert Norman (1909–1957), Canadian diplomat and historian
Edward Norman (born 1938), Canon Chancellor of York Minster, ecclesiastical historian
Edward Norman (bishop), KBE, DSO, MC (1916–1987), New Zealand Anglican bishop
Eldred Norman (1914–1971), Australian inventor and racing-car driver
Emile Norman (1918–2009), iconoclastic California artist
Ernest Norman (1904–1971), American electrical engineer, co-founder of the Unarius Academy of Science
Ernie Norman (1913–1993), Australian rugby league player
Florence Norman, CBE (1881–1964), English socialite and activist
Floyd Norman (born 1935), American animator on Walt Disney films in the late '50s and early '60s
Frank Norman (1930–1980), British novelist and playwright
Fred Norman (born 1942), American baseball player
Fred B. Norman (1882–1947), U.S. Representative from Washington
Frederick Norman (1839–1916), English merchant banker, director of merchant bank Brown, Shipley & Co
Georg Norman (died 1552 or 1553), civil servant of German origin, in Swedish service from 1539
George Norman (disambiguation)
Gilbert Norman (1915–1944) in Saint-Cloud, Hauts-de-Seine
Greg Norman (born 1955), Australian professional golfer
Gurney Norman (born 1937), American writer, documentarian, and professor
H. Wayne Norman Jr. (1955–2018), American lawyer and politician
Hayley Marie Norman (born 1989), American actress and model
Henry Wylie Norman GCB, GCMG, CIE (1826–1904), Field Marshal, colonial Governor of Jamaica and Queensland
Howard Norman (born 1949), American writer
Ian Norman, Professor of Nursing and Inter-Disciplinary Care at King's College London 
Jace Norman, actor
James Norman (disambiguation)
Jane Norman, United Kingdom-based women's clothing retailer
Jared Norman (born 1974), former English cricketer
Jennie Van Norman (1870–1946), birth name of stage actress Jane Peyton
Jerry Norman (sinologist) (1936–2012), American sinologist and linguist
Jerry Norman (basketball) (born 1929/1930), American basketball coach
Jesse Norman (born 1962), British Conservative politician
Jessye Norman (1945–2019), American opera singer and recitalist
Jim Norman (disambiguation)
Jimmy Norman (1937–2011), American rhythm and blues and jazz musician and a songwriter
Joe Norman (born 1956), former professional American football linebacker
John Norman (disambiguation)
Josh Norman (cornerback) (born 1987), American football cornerback
K. R. Norman (born 1925), leading scholar of Middle Indo-Aryan or Prakrit, particularly of Pali
Karl Norman (born 1983), Australian rules football player
Keith Norman, general secretary of the Associated Society of Locomotive Engineers and Firemen (ASLEF)
Kelvin Norman (1955–2005), deceased American soccer defender
Ken Norman (born 1964), American former professional basketball player
Kent Norman, American cognitive psychologist, expert on Computer Rage
Larry Norman (1947–2008), Christian rock music pioneer
Larry Norman (canoer) (born 1966), canoer
Lavinia Norman (1882–1983), one of the founders of Alpha Kappa Alpha Sorority, Incorporated
Leonard Norman (1947–2021), Jersey politician and Connétable of Saint Clement
Leslie Norman (disambiguation)
Lindsay D. Norman (born 1938), American mining engineer and educator
Linly Norman (c. 1836–1869), English pianist and conductor in Australia
Lisa Norman (born 1979), shinty player and manager from Kincardine, Fife, Scotland
Lisanne Norman (born 1951), Scottish science fiction author
Loulie Jean Norman (1913–2005), coloratura soprano
Lucille Norman (1921–1998), American singer and film actress
Ludvig Norman (1831–1885), Swedish composer, conductor, pianist, and music teacher
Magnus Norman (born 1976), Swedish professional tennis player
Maidie Norman (1912–1998), American stage, film and television actress
Marc Norman (born 1941), American screenwriter
Marciano Norman (born 1954), head of the Indonesian State Intelligence Agency
Marrio Norman (born 1986), American football player
Mark Norman (disambiguation)
Marsha Norman (born 1947), American playwright and Pulitzer Prize winner
Matt Norman (Canadian football) (born 1988), Canadian football offensive lineman
Matthew Norman (born 1986), Australian drug trafficker, member of the Bali Nine
Maurice Norman (born 1934), English former footballer
Max Magnus Norman (born 1973), Swedish contemporary artist
Max Norman, record producer and recording engineer
Michael Norman (disambiguation)
Moe Norman (1929–2004), Canadian professional golfer
Montagu Norman, 1st Baron Norman (1871–1950), English banker
Monty Norman (1928–2022), British singer and film composer
Moriah van Norman (born 1984), American water polo player
Nancy Norman (born 1925), American vocalist
Nathan Norman (sealing captain) (1809–1883), sealing captain, political figure in Newfoundland
Neil Norman, British playwright and critic
Nelson Norman (born 1958), former Major League Baseball shortstop
Nigel Norman (1897–1943), Baronet, RAF officer and businessman
Nils Norman (born 1966), artist living in London
Norman B. Norman (1914–1991), American advertising executive who co-founded the Norman, Craig & Kummel advertising agency
Oliver Norman (1911–1983), English cricketer
Patrick Norman (singer) (born 1946), Canadian country singer from Quebec
Patrick Norman (musician), American guitarist for Rusted Root
Paul Norman (disambiguation)
Peg Norman (born 1964), Canadian documentary filmmaker
Peter Norman (1942–2006), Australian track athlete and Olympic medallist
Peter Norman (politician) (born 1958), Swedish economist and politician
Pettis Norman (born 1939), former professional American football tight end
Philip Norman (artist) FSA (1842–1931), British artist, author and antiquary
Philip Norman (author) (born 1943), English novelist, biographer, journalist and playwright
Rae Norman (1958–2020), American actress
Ralph Norman (born 1953), American real estate developer
Ray Norman (1889–1971), Australian rugby league footballer and coach
Remington Norman (born 1944), wine expert and author
Rex Norman (1891–1961), Australian rugby league footballer
Richard Norman, British philosopher
Richard Norman (chemist) (1932–1993), British chemist
Richie Norman (born 1935), former English footballer
Rick Norman (born 1963), former Australian rules footballer
Robert Norman, 16th-century British mariner, compass builder, and hydrographer
Roger Norman (disambiguation)
Roger the Norman or Roger II of Sicily (1095–1154), King of Sicily
Rolla Norman (1889–1971), French actor
Ronald Collet Norman JP (1873–1963), banker, administrator and politician
Ross Norman (born 1959), former professional squash player from New Zealand
Russel Norman (born 1967), New Zealand politician and environmentalist
Ruth Norman (1900–1993), also known as Uriel, American religious leader
Samuel Hinga Norman (1940–2007), Sierra Leonean politician from the Mende tribe
Seth Walker Norman (born 1934), US judge, former Democrat regional politician, former airman
Stephen Norman (1918–1946), the grandson of the founder of Zionism, Theodor Herzl
Steve Norman (born 1960), English musician who plays saxophone, guitar, percussion for Spandau Ballet
Terry Norman (born 1949), Kent State University student allegedly involved in the Kent State shootings
Tom Norman (1860–1930), English businessman and showman
Tom Van Norman (born 1964), Democratic member of the South Dakota House of Representatives
Tony Norman (born 1958), former professional footballer
Torquil Norman CBE (born 1933), British businessman, aircraft enthusiast, and arts philanthropist
Victor D. Norman (born 1946), Norwegian economist, politician and newspaper columnist
Warren Norman (born 1990), American football player
Will Norman (1903–1964), professional football player
William Norman (VC) VC (1832–1896), English recipient of the Victoria Cross
William the Norman (died 1075), medieval Bishop of London

Given name 

Norm Abram (born 1949), American carpenter, cabinet maker and television personality
Norman Abramson (1932–2020), American engineer and computer scientist
Norman Allinger (1928–2020), American chemist and Nobel laureate
Norman Armitage (Norman Cohn; 1907–1972), American Olympic bronze medal-winning saber fencer
Norman Arterburn (1902–1979), Justice of the Indiana Supreme Court
Norman Baker (born 1957), British Liberal Democrat politician and former Home Office minister
Norman Banks (broadcaster) (1905–1985), Australian radio broadcaster
Norman Barrett (1903–1979), Australian-born British thoracic surgeon
Norman Bates (musician) (1927–2004), American jazz double-bass player
Norman Bethune (1890–1939), Canadian physician and medical innovator
Norman Borlaug (1914–2009), American agricultural scientist, humanitarian and Nobel Laureate
Norman L. Bowen (1887–1956), Canadian geologist
Norman Bridwell (1928–2014), American author and cartoonist best known for the Clifford the Big Red Dog book series.
Norman Carlberg (1928–2018), American sculptor
Norman Keith "Sailor Jerry" Collins (1911–1973), American tattoo artist
Norman Spencer Chaplin (1919–1919), first son of Charlie Chaplin
Norman Cook (born 1963), British DJ and electronic dance music musician (born Quentin Cook, aka Fatboy Slim)
Norman Cousins (1915–1990), American journalist and political activist
Norman Cornish (1919–2014), English mining artist
Norman Davies (born 1939), leading English historian
Norman Edge (1934–2018), American jazz musician
Norman Fell (1924–1998), American actor of film and television
Norman Finkelstein (born 1953), American political scientist and author
Norman Fowler, Baron Fowler (born 1938), English Conservative politician
Norman Gibbs (Canadian football) (born 1960), American football player
Normie Glick (1927–1989), basketball player
Norman Gordon (1911–2014), South African cricketer
Norman J. Grossfeld (born 1963), American television producer and writer
Norman Hetherington, (1921–2010), Australian cartoonist and puppeteer
Norman Himes (1900–1958), Canadian National Hockey League player
Norman Ives (1923–1978) American artist, graphic designer, educator, and fine art publisher
Norman Jewison (born 1926), Canadian filmmaker
Norman Jones (disambiguation), several persons
Norman Kerry (1894–1956), American actor
Norman Kwong (1929–2016), Canadian Football League player, businessman and politician
Norman Lamb (born 1957), British Liberal Democrat politician
Norman Lamont (born 1942), British Conservative politician and former Chancellor of the Exchequer
Norman Lear (born 1922), American television producer
Norman Lebrecht (born 1948), British commentator on music and cultural affairs, and novelist
Norman Lewis (fencer) (1915–2006), American Olympic fencer
Norman Lloyd (1914–2021), American actor
Norman Lindsay (1879–1969), Australian artist, sculptor, writer, editorial cartoonist, scale modeler, and amateur boxer
Norm Macdonald (1959–2021), Canadian stand-up comedian, writer, producer and actor
Norman Mailer (1923–2007), American writer
Norman Malcolm (1911–1990), American philosopher and biographer of Ludwig Wittgenstein
Norman Müller (born 1985), German decathlete
Norman B. Norman (1914–1991), American advertising executive who co-founded the Norman, Craig & Kummel advertising agency
Norman Painting (1924–2009), British radio actor
Norman Powell (born 1993), American basketball player
Norman Reedus (born 1969), American actor and former model
Norman Rockwell (1894–1978), American painter
Norman Routledge (1928–2013), English mathematician and schoolteacher
Normie Rowe (born 1947), Australian pop singer
Normie Roy (1928–2011), American Major League Baseball pitcher
Norman Sartorius (born 1935), Croatian psychiatrist
Norman Schuster (born 1979), German boxer
Norman Schwarzkopf, Jr. (1934–2012), United States Army general, leader of coalition forces in 1991 Gulf War
Norm Sherry (1931–2021), American Major League Baseball player and manager
Normie Smith (1908–1988), Canadian National Hockey League goaltender
Norman Smith (record producer) (1923–2008), British pop musician, recording engineer and producer, also known as Hurricane Smith
Norman Stone (1941–2019), Scottish historian and adviser to Margaret Thatcher
Norman Tate (born 1942), American long and triple jumper
Norman Taylor (rower) (born 1899), Canadian rower
Norman Taylor (basketball) (1965–2020), American basketball player
Norman Tebbit (born 1931), British Conservative politician
Norman D. Vaughan, (1905–2005), American dogsled driver and explorer
Norman Vaughan (comedian) (1923–2002), English comedian
Norman Wisdom (1915–2010), English comedian, singer and actor
Norman Yokely (1906–1975), American baseball player
Norman Haikal Rendra Iskandar (born 2004), Malaysian rapper and film producer

Fictional characters

 Norman Arminger, the primary villain of the early Emberverse series by S.M. Stirling
 Norman Babcock, in the film ParaNorman
 Norman Bates, created by writer Robert Bloch and portrayed in the film Psycho by Anthony Perkins
 Norman Clegg, in the British sitcom Last of the Summer Wine
 Norman Stanley Fletcher, protagonist of the British TV prison comedy Porridge, portrayed by Ronnie Barker
 Norman Jayden, in the video game Heavy Rain
 Norman Osborn, the arch-enemy of Spider-Man
 Norm Peterson, regular on the television show Cheers and guest character on several others, portrayed by George Wendt
 Norman Stansfield, the main antagonist in the movie Léon: The Professional
 Norman Wilson (The Wire), on the drama TV show The Wire
 Rod Norman, from the BBC soap opera EastEnders
 Norman (Pokémon), in the Pokémon universe
 Norman (The Promised Neverland), a supporting protagonist in the manga series The Promised Neverland
 Norman Price, from Fireman Sam

See also 
Van Norman Machine Tool Company, American manufacturer of milling machines and other machine tools
Normand, also a given name and surname
Nordmann, demonym of the people of Norway

Notes and references 

English-language surnames
Ethnonymic surnames
Dutch masculine given names
English masculine given names
German masculine given names
Norwegian masculine given names
Scottish masculine given names